George Bellamy (born 8 October 1941) is an English musician, singer and former rhythm guitarist for The Tornados. He is the father of Matt Bellamy, frontman of British rock band Muse.

Career
Bellamy is primarily a rock 'n' roll and country-and-western singer. In the late 1950s, he played in a band and later a duo with Alan Klein. Bellamy decided to audition for a group formed by Joe Meek that was advertised in the music press. It was this audition that determined that Bellamy would play rhythm guitar for the Tornados, who were firstly a session band for Meek. However, the group reached new heights with their instrumental "Telstar", which reached number one all over the world and was the first British rock song to be a number-one single in the United States. Bellamy wrote one of The Tornados' tracks, "Ridin' the Wind", which also was a hit single in the USA.

Bellamy left the Tornados in 1963 when it became necessary to cease touring because of problems with his lower spine. After medical treatment, he worked with Don Charles, who had set up his own recording company with Alan Caddy named "Sound Venture". Bellamy continued doing session work in London until 1972, working with arrangers and producers such as Burt Bacharach, George Martin, and Ivor Raymond. Bellamy re-recorded "Telstar" with his own record company "SRT" in 1975 with members of the original Tornados.

His son, Matt Bellamy, is the lead singer of the band Muse, the music influences from George Bellamy can be heard on Muse album "Black Holes and Revelations".

Rough Terrain
In late 1997 he formed a Devon-based band, called Rough Terrain, who played at local events in the UK. The members were:

Richard Harris – Lead Guitar
George Bellamy – Rhythm Guitar/Vocals
Jodie West – Vocals
Michael Green – Bass Guitar
Vic Johns – Drums

Bellamy began working in the building industry of Devon in 1984. He retired to Costa Blanca, south of Alicante, Spain, in 2004 and formed the rock band Freeway.

The 2009 feature film Telstar portrays the young Bellamy, played by actor Alan Scally.

After returning to UK in late 2010 Bellamy formed a band in Devon called The Lyrics. The members are:
George Bellamy - Rhythm guitar/vocals
(Previous colleague) Jodie West - vocals/percussion
Terry Stacey - drums/vocals
Jamie Milne - lead guitar/vocals
Jon Milne - bass guitar/technicals

References

1941 births
Living people
People from Sunderland
Musicians from Tyne and Wear
English rock guitarists
English male singers
English rock singers
Rhythm guitarists
English male guitarists
The Tornados members